The 2022 Shepherd Rams football team represented Shepherd University as a member of the East Division of the Pennsylvania State Athletic Conference (PSAC) during the 2022 NCAA Division II football season. Led by fifth-year head coach Ernie McCook, the Rams compiled an overall record of 13–2 with a mark of 7–0 in conference play, winning the PSAC East Division title. Shepherd lost the PSAC Championship Game to West Division champion . The Rams advanced to the NCAA Division II Football Championship playoffs, where they beat  in the first round,  in the second round, and IUP in the quarterfinal, before falling to Colorado Mines in the semifinals. The team played home games at Ram Stadium in Shepherdstown, West Virginia. The 2022 season was the third for the Rams as a member of the PSAC after joining the conference in 2019.

Preseason
After finishing the 2021 season with a record of 13–2 and reaching the national semifinals, the Rams were ranked No. 6 in the preseason poll.

Regular season
With their win against Bloomsburg on October 29th, the Rams clinched the PSAC East championship, and their first appearance in the PSAC Football Championship Game since joining the conference in 2019.

Schedule

Rankings

References

Shepherd
Shepherd Rams football seasons
Shepherd Rams football